Healthy Living may refer to:

 A lifestyle characterized by good health
 Minister responsible for Healthy Living, a ministerial position in the government of Manitoba, Canada
 BC Healthy Living Alliance, a coalition of health professionals in British Columbia, Canada
 Healthy Living, a publishing imprint of The Farm (Tennessee)

See also
 Healthy diet